Fairvale was an incorporated village in Kings County, New Brunswick, Canada. It was amalgamated with the town of Rothesay on January 1, 1998.

Notable people

See also
List of neighbourhoods in New Brunswick

References

Neighbourhoods in New Brunswick
Populated places disestablished in 1998
Former villages in New Brunswick